Sir Geoffrey Allan Jellicoe  (8 October 1900 – 17 July 1996) was an English architect, town planner, landscape architect, garden designer, landscape and garden historian, lecturer and author. His strongest interest was in landscape and garden design.

As a designer, he often included "his distinctive signature characteristics, such as canals, weirs, bridges, viewing platforms and associated planting by Jellicoe's wife, Susan," as at the Hemel Hempstead water gardens he designed for this new town in the late 1950s.  Fittingly, the garden canal he designed in the 1970s for the Royal Horticultural Society's gardens at RHS Wisley to display waterlilies was later renamed the "Jellicoe Canal" as a memorial.

Life

Jellicoe was born in Chelsea, London the younger son of Florence Waterson (née Waylett) and her husband, George Edward Jellicoe, a publisher's manager, and later publisher. He studied at the Architectural Association in London in 1919 and won a British Prix de Rome for Architecture in 1923, which enabled him to research his first book Italian Gardens of the Renaissance with John C. Shepherd. This pioneering study did much to re-awaken interest in this great period of landscape design and through its copious photographic illustrations publicized the then perilously decayed condition of many of the gardens.

In 1929 he was a founding member of the Landscape Institute and from 1939 to 1949 he was its President. In 1948, he became the founding President of the International Federation of Landscape Architects (IFLA). From 1954 to 1968 he was a member of Royal Fine Art Commission and from 1967 to 1974 a Trustee of Tate Gallery.

Jellicoe taught at the University of Greenwich from 1979 to 1989. He came as a lecturer and visiting critic, usually on six occasions a year.

On 11 July 1936, he married Susan Pares (1907–1986), the daughter of Margaret Ellis (Daisy), née Dixon (1879–1964) and Sir Bernard Pares KBE (1867–1949), the historian and academic known for his work on Russia.

He died in Devon, of heart failure, on the 17 July 1996. He was cremated at Golders Green Crematorium.

National Life Stories conducted an oral history interview (C467/6) with Geoffrey Jellicoe in 1996 for its Architects Lives' collection held by the British Library.

Design projects

Note: All locations below are in England unless stated otherwise.
1934–36 Caveman Restaurant, Cheddar Gorge, Somerset
1934–39 Ditchley Park, Oxfordshire
1935 Plan for Calverton Colliery, Calverton, Nottinghamshire
1936 The Great Mablethorpe Plan, Lincolnshire
1942 Houses for munitions workers at Whitchurch, Cardiff, Wales
1945 "Corbusian" plan for Wolverton (since 1967, part of Milton Keynes)
1947 Plan for Hemel Hempstead, Hertfordshire
1951–52 East Housing Site, Lansbury Estate, Poplar
1952 Church Hill Memorial Garden, Walsall, West Midlands
1956 Harvey's Store roof garden, Guildford, Surrey
1957–59 Water Gardens, Hemel Hempstead, Hertfordshire
1959 Cliveden Rose Garden, Taplow, Buckinghamshire
1955–68 Glass Age Development Committee, sponsored by Pilkington Glass with Edward D. Mills and Ove Arup & Partners. Projects included Motopia, the Crystal Span Bridge, plans for Soho, Sea City and others.
1964–65 Kennedy Memorial Garden, Runnymede, Surrey
1970–90 Shute House, Donhead St Mary, Wiltshire – extensive gardens, his last work, his favourite, and considered to be his finest
1972–90 St Paul's Walden Bury, Hertfordshire – garden restoration and additions
1979–89 Hartwell House Garden, Buckinghamshire
1980–86 Sutton Place Garden, Surrey
1984 Moody Gardens, Galveston, Texas, USA

Books and other publications
 Italian Gardens of the Renaissance (with J.C. Shepherd) (1926)
 Baroque Gardens of Austria (1932)
 The Shakespeare Memorial Theatre, Stratford-upon-Avon, etc. (1933)
 Garden Decoration & Ornament for Smaller Houses (1936)
 Gardens of Europe (1937)
 Report accompanying an Outline Plan for Guildford prepared for the Municipal Borough Council (1945)
 Studies in Landscape Design (1960)
 Motopia: A Study in the Evolution of Urban Landscape (1961)
 A Landscape Plan for Sark (1967)
 The Landscape of Man (1975)
 Blue Circle Cement Hope Works Derbyshire (1980?)
 The Guelph Lectures on Landscape Design (1983)
 The Oxford Companion to Gardens (1986)
 The Landscape of Civilisation (1989)
 The Studies of a Landscape Designer over 80 years (c.1993)
 Gardens & Design, Gardens of Europe (1995)

See also
Landscape Institute
Landscape planning
Collective landscape
International Federation of Landscape Architects

References

Further reading
Spens, Michael. The complete landscape designs and gardens of Geoffrey Jellicoe c1994
Spens, Michael. Gardens of the mind c1992.

External links
Portrait by Derry Moore, 1992 At the National portrait Gallery – Accessed November 2021
Portrait by Tara Heinemann, 1984 At the National portrait Gallery – Accessed November 2021
Portrait by Anne-Katrin Purkiss, 1990 At the National portrait Gallery – Accessed November 2021

1900 births
1996 deaths
English landscape and garden designers
English landscape architects
English gardeners
English garden writers
British garden writers
Prix de Rome (Britain) winners
Victoria Medal of Honour recipients
Golders Green Crematorium
Royal Academicians
People from Chelsea, London